John Fairgrieve (18 April 1926 – 20 July 2014) was a British sprinter. He competed in the men's 200 metres at the 1948 Summer Olympics.

Competition record

References

1926 births
2014 deaths
Athletes (track and field) at the 1948 Summer Olympics
British male sprinters
Olympic athletes of Great Britain
Place of birth missing